Laverton Airport  is an airport in Laverton, Western Australia. It has an operational and storage capacity of 19 medium-sized planes; however, it has an average of only 417 flights a year.

The airport received $171,314 for security upgrades in 2006. The security status was changed in 2011.

Airlines and destinations

See also
 List of airports in Western Australia
 Aviation transport in Australia

References

External links
 Airservices Aerodromes & Procedure Charts

Airports in Western Australia
Goldfields-Esperance